N. Valarmathi is an Indian scientist and project director of RISAT-1, India's first indigenously-developed Radar Imaging Satellite. She is the first person to receive Abdul Kalam Award, instituted by Government of Tamil Nadu in honour of the former president Abdul Kalam in 2015.

Early life
She was born in Ariyalur, Tamil Nadu and went to the Nirmala Girls Higher Secondary School. She graduated her Bachelor of engineering from Government College of Technology, Coimbatore and Masters in Electronics and Communications from Anna University.

Career
She has been working with the ISRO since 1984 and involved in any missions including Insat 2A, IRS IC, IRS ID, TES. She became project director of India's first indigenously-developed Radar Imaging Satellite RISAT-1, which was launched successfully on 2012.

References

Living people
20th-century Indian physicists
Scientists from Tamil Nadu
People from Ariyalur district
1959 births